Embleton may refer to:

Places
 Embleton, County Durham, England
 Embleton, Cumbria, England
 Embleton, Northumberland, England
 Embleton, Western Australia

People
 Clifford Embleton, British geomorphologist
 Ron Embleton, British painter and illustrator